The Senior CLASS Award is presented each year to the outstanding senior NCAA Division I Student-Athlete of the Year in men's ice hockey. The award was established in 2007.

So far, no women's version of this award has been created. Three NCAA sports that are sponsored for both men and women have Senior CLASS Awards for only one sex—ice hockey and lacrosse do not have women's awards, and volleyball does not have a men's award.

Recipients

References

External links
Official site

Student athlete awards in the United States
^
College ice hockey in the United States lists
Awards established in 2007